Carlo Giannini (10 July 1948, in Brescia – 11 September 2004, in Pavia) was an econometrician and mathematical economist who taught at the Universities of Ancona, Bergamo, Calabria, Milan and Pavia during the period 1976–2004.

He is renowned for his published contributions to mathematical economics and econometrics.

1948 births
2004 deaths
Italian economists
Academic staff of the University of Pavia
Econometricians